Thomas Law McMillan (April 18, 1888 – July 15, 1966), nicknamed Rebel, was an American professional baseball shortstop. He played five seasons in Major League Baseball (MLB) from 1908 to 1912 for the Brooklyn Superbas, Cincinnati Reds, and New York Highlanders. He is an alumnus of Georgia Institute of Technology.

McMillan made his MLB debut with the Brooklyn Superbas (who later became the Brooklyn Dodgers) on August 19, 1908, and appear in his final game on October 5, 1912.

References

Sources
Page at Baseball Reference

1888 births
1966 deaths
People from Pittston, Pennsylvania
Brooklyn Superbas players
Cincinnati Reds players
New York Highlanders players
Major League Baseball shortstops
Baseball players from Pennsylvania
Georgia Tech Yellow Jackets baseball players
Minor league baseball managers
Augusta Tourists players
Baton Rouge Cajuns players
Jacksonville Jays players
Rochester Bronchos players
Rochester Hustlers players
Indianapolis Indians players
Chattanooga Lookouts players
Atlanta Crackers players
St. Paul Saints (AA) players
Mobile Bears players
Memphis Chickasaws players
Little Rock Travelers players
Nashville Vols players
Daytona Beach Islanders players
Clearwater Pelicans players
Jacksonville Tars players
Albany Nuts players
Macon Peaches players